The Bolt Who Screwed Christmas is an independent animated short film and a parody  of How the Grinch Stole Christmas! written and directed by John Wardlaw and animated by Adny Angrand. The film features the final performance of actor Jonathan Harris and co-stars Tress MacNeille. The film also features an original score by Gary Stockdale and music by director John Wardlaw's band, Anti-m.

Jonathan Harris
Written in 1997, the script was presented to Jonathan Harris in 1998 though it was not until 2000 that his voice work was actually recorded. Harris died on November 3, 2002, long before the film was completed making it his final performance. In 2006 an additional scene was added to the film and Jonathan Harris' former Lost In Space co-stars Bill Mumy, Angela Cartwright and Marta Kristen added their voices to the film. The film was dedicated in his memory.

Production and release
Completed in 2009 the film made its first appearance at the non-theatrical 2009 Los Angeles Reel Film Festival where it was honored with three awards. In 2010 it made its theatrical world premier in the home town of film-maker John Wardlaw at the 25th Annual Santa Barbara International Film Festival (SBIFF). Between December 2009 and December 2011, the film played in 30 film festivals, winning 13 awards. Its final theatrical appearance was at L’hybride in Lille France.

Considering the film features a cast from the TV series Lost In Space it was interesting that two of the films praises came from writers from the original series of Star Trek. "It had a great animation style, clever and slightly naughty story (well put together) and was totally enjoyable!" claimed D. C. Fontana
"I laughed my nuts off," stated David Gerrold.

In 2011 The Bolt Who Screwed Christmas was released on DVD as part of a collection of short films and music videos by Wardlaw.  The DVD bonus features include early animations and audio out takes.  The film was licensed to ShortsHD and ShortsTV in 2014.

Awards

See also
 List of Christmas films

References

External links
 Official website

American independent films
American animated short films
2000s animated short films
2000s Christmas films
2009 films
2000s American animated films
2009 animated films
American Christmas films
2000s English-language films